Ketopantoic acid is the organic compound with the formula HOCH2(CH3)2CC(O)CO2H. At physiological conditions, ketopantoic acid exists as its conjugate base, ketopantoate (HOCH2(CH3)2CC(O)CO2−).

Biosynthetic context
Its biosynthesis proceeds from ketoisovalerate by hydroxymethylation:
(CH3)2CHC(O)CO2− + CH2O  →  HOCH2(CH3)2CC(O)CO2−

This conversion is catalyzed by ketopantoate hydroxymethyltransferase, which gives ketopantoate. 

Ketopantoate is substrate for 2-dehydropantoate 2-reductase, which produces pantoate, a precursor to pantothenic acid, a common prosthetic group.

References